Xeniya Balabayeva (born 2005) is a Kazakhstani chess player who holds the title of Woman International Master (WIM, 2021).

Biography 
In 2018 Xeniya Balabayeva won Western Asia Youth Chess Championship in G14 age group. In 2019 she won Asian Youth Rapid Chess Championship in G14 age group. In 2020 Xeniya Balabayeva won Kazakhstani Youth Chess Championship in G16 age group with a hundred percent result - 9 out of 9. In 2021 she won Asia Youth Chess Championship in G16 age group.

In 2021 Xeniya Balabayeva ranked in 2nd place in Kazakhstani Youth Chess Championship in G20 age group and Kazakhstani Women's Chess Championship. In this same year she won Online World Youth Chess Championship in Girls under 16 age group.

Xeniya Balabayeva played for Kazakhstan in the Women's Chess Olympiad:
 In 2022, at third board in the 44th Chess Olympiad (women) in Chennai (+3, =5, -2).

In 2021, she was awarded the FIDE Women International Master (WIM) title.

References

External links 

2005 births
Living people
Chess Woman International Masters
Kazakhstani female chess players